Santa Maria in Aquiro is a church in Rome, Italy. It is dedicated to Mary, mother of Jesus, and is located on Piazza Capranica.

The church is ancient – it was restored by Pope Gregory III in the 8th century, and thus must have existed before then. One theory is that it was the titulus Equitii, though San Martino ai Monti is a more likely candidate. It is also referred to as Santa Maria della Visitazione, notably by Pope Urban VI in 1389. The origins of the name are nebulous; most attribute it to a corruption of the term a Cyro, perhaps referring in early days to a neighborhood resident named Cyrus or deriving from Cyrus. According to another theory Acyro refers to a corruption of the Latin word circus, a stadium for horse racing; the Circus Flaminius was located in the vicinity. In 1540 Pope Paul III granted the church to the Confraternity of Orphans, and it was restored in 1588.

Art and architecture
The most important work of art in the church is a 14th-century painting, in the apse, of the Madonna and Child with St Stephen, attributed to the school of Pietro Cavallini. This painting and the funeral lapidary monuments in the vestibule are from the medieval church of Santo Stefano del Trullo, destroyed during the pontificate of Pope Alexander VII (1655–1667). There are also paintings from the 17th and 18th centuries. The facade was completed by 1774 by Pietro Camporese the Elder, based on designs of Giovanni Francesco Braccioli. The interior was redecorated by Cesare Mariani in 1866.

Two chapels have paintings by followers of Caravaggio: the third chapel at right has a Virgin and Saints (1617) by Carlo Saraceni, while the second chapel on the left has three canvasses – Deposition from the Cross, Crowning with the crown of thorns, and Flagellation of Christ (1635-1640) – attributed to the Frenchman Trophime Bigot. Formerly these paintings were thought to be by the hand of Gerard van Honthorst.

Cardinal-deacons
Santa Maria in Aquiro has been a titular church since the 11th century. The current cardinal-deacon is Angelo Amato.

References 

Titular churches
Renaissance architecture in Rome
Churches of Rome (rione Colonna)
16th-century Roman Catholic church buildings in Italy 
Roman Catholic churches completed in 1588